Jesús Alonso Cabello Rojas (born 12 November 1982) is a Venezuelan football manager.

Career
Born in Ciudad Bolívar, Cabello was a youth manager at Mineros de Guayana and Caroní before being appointed assistant manager of Estudiantes de Caroní in 2011. His first managerial experience occurred in 2015, with Diamantes de Guayana.

In 2016, Cabello was appointed manager of Academia Puerto Cabello's women team. In 2018, after a year in the club's youth sides, he took over Gran Valencia Maracay.

On 18 July 2019, after again being assistant at LALA, Cabello was named in charge of Yaracuyanos. He won the Segunda División in his first season, and missed out a qualification to the Copa Sudamericana in his second. On 15 December 2020, he resigned.

On 10 March 2021, Cabello returned to Mineros, being named first team manager.

Honours
Yaracuyanos
Venezuelan Segunda División: 2019

References

External links

1982 births
Living people
People from Ciudad Bolívar
Venezuelan football managers
Venezuelan Primera División managers
Yaracuyanos F.C. managers
Mineros de Guayana managers